This is a list of Corbett mountains in Scotland by height.

The first list was compiled in the 1920s by John Rooke Corbett, a Bristol-based climber and Scottish Mountaineering Club ("SMC") member, and was published posthumously, after his sister passed it to the SMC, in the 1953 edition of Munro's Tables. By definition, all Corbetts, given their prominence, are Marilyns. The SMC keeps a list of Corbetts.

Climbers who climb all of the Corbetts are called Corbetteers, with the first being John Corbett himself who completed them in 1943.  The second completion was by William McKnight Docharty in May 1960. A list of Corbetteers is maintained, which as of July 2018, totalled 678.

Corbett mountains by height

This list was downloaded from the Database of British and Irish Hills ("DoBIH") in September 2020, and are peaks the DoBIH marks as being Corbetts ("C").  The SMC updates their list of official Corbetts from time to time, and the DoBIH also updates their measurements as more detailed surveys are recorded, so these tables should not be amended or updated unless the entire DoBIH data is re-downloaded again.

Bibliography

DoBIH codes

The DoBIH uses the following codes for the various classifications of mountains and hills in the British Isles, which many of the above peaks also fall into:

Prefixes:  *s	sub; *x	deleted

Suffixes: =	twin

See also

List of mountains of the British Isles by height
List of mountains of the British Isles by prominence
Lists of mountains and hills in the British Isles
List of mountains in Ireland
List of Munro mountains in Scotland
List of Murdos (mountains)
List of Furth mountains in the British Isles
List of Marilyns in the British Isles
List of P600 mountains in the British Isles

Notes

References

External links
The Database of British and Irish Hills (DoBIH), the largest database of British Isles mountains
Hill Bagging UK & Ireland, the searchable interface for the DoBIH
The Relative Hills of Britain, a website dedicated to mountain and hill classification

Corbetts